Ganyan Township is a rural township in Cili County, Hunan Province, People's Republic of China.

Administrative division
The township is divided into 21 villages: 

Ganyan
Wanfu
Guizhu
Dongyu
Zhongxin
Baiyan
Liangyu
Cuanxi
Yuetai
Siping
Sanping

Taiping
Taoya
Yanzhu
Ma'an
Qinzhong
Gaoling
Chuanshi
Jinyan
Pingxi
Yuanyichang

References

Divisions of Cili County
Ethnic townships of the People's Republic of China